Miguel Ángel Cordero Sánchez (born 10 September 1987) is a Spanish professional footballer who plays for CD Atlético Baleares as a defensive midfielder.

Club career
Born in Lebrija, Province of Seville, Cordero arrived at Sevilla FC's youth ranks at the age of 12 from local CA Antoniano. In 2006 he moved to Sevilla Atlético, helping Sevilla FC's reserves achieve promotion to the second division.

After totalling 45 matches with Sevilla B the following two seasons – suffering relegation in his second – and some call-ups to the first team, although he never appeared officially for the Andalusians, Cordero was loaned to another side in the third tier, Real Madrid Castilla. In August 2010 he signed with Xerez CD, returning to his native region.

In his first season, Cordero was one of the most used players by manager Javi López (almost 2,900 minutes of action), scoring five goals as Xerez easily retained their status. He also collected 15 yellow cards.

Cordero joined AEK Athens F.C. in the summer of 2012, going on to remain several years in Greece and help to two consecutive promotions to reach the Super League after they were relegated twice in the same campaign due to irregularities. On 25 June 2016, however, as his contract was nearing its expiration, he was told by the board of directors to look for a new club.

On 30 August 2016, Cordero signed a one-year deal with Gimnàstic de Tarragona of the Spanish second division. After featuring sparingly, he moved to the level below with FC Cartagena the following 1 August.

Cordero helped the Efesé to promote to division two in 2020, contributing 21 games to this feat. On 29 December 2020, already a fringe player, the 33-year-old terminated his contract with the club and joined third-tier side CD Atlético Baleares just hours later.

Honours
Sevilla B
Segunda División B: 2006–07

AEK
Greek Football Cup: 2015–16
Gamma Ethniki: 2013–14 (Group VI)
Football League Greece: 2014–15 (South Group)

Cartagena
Segunda División B: 2019-20 (Group IV and Play-offs)

References

External links

1987 births
Living people
People from Lebrija
Sportspeople from the Province of Seville
Spanish footballers
Footballers from Andalusia
Association football midfielders
Segunda División players
Segunda División B players
Sevilla Atlético players
Real Madrid Castilla footballers
Xerez CD footballers
Gimnàstic de Tarragona footballers
FC Cartagena footballers
CD Atlético Baleares footballers
Super League Greece players
Football League (Greece) players
AEK Athens F.C. players
Spanish expatriate footballers
Expatriate footballers in Greece
Spanish expatriate sportspeople in Greece